The Sportavia-Pützer RS-180 Sportsman is a four-seat sport aircraft that was produced in Germany in the late 1970s.

The aircraft is a conventional, low-wing cantilever monoplane with fixed tricycle undercarriage. The pilot and passengers are seated in 2+2 configuration under a large bubble canopy. The structure is of wood, covered in plywood and given an outer skin of fibreglass.

Design and development

Rhein-Flugzeugbau (RFB) was founded in 1956. The first prototype Sportsman first flew on 1 March 1973, but the second prototype, which made its maiden flight on 28 April 1976, was a completely redesigned version which was created by Sportavia. This redesigned model was designated the RF-6C Sportsman when it entered production in late 1976, and was renamed RS-180 Sportsman when a new empennage design was added in early 1978, following the fatal crash of the prototype in May 1977. The extensive redesign included reshaping the horizontal tail and relocating it part-way up the fin, changing the wing profile, and removing the turned-down wingtips of the RF-6C. In this form, the RS-180 gained German type certification in 1978.

Basic structure of the Sportsman is wood, with a low-wing cantilever monoplane configuration. The surface is covered with fibreglass. A fixed nosewheel undercarriage with wheel fairings is used. The cabin employs a large bubble canopy.

At the end of 1980, Sportavia-Pützer was integrated into the RFB organisation, the RS-180 being re-designated FRB RS-180 Sportsman. Production was halted in early 1981, after fewer than two dozen units had been completed.

Specifications (RS 180)

Notes

References

1970s German sport aircraft
Fournier aircraft
Sportavia-Pützer aircraft
Single-engined tractor aircraft
Low-wing aircraft
Aircraft first flown in 1978